In Japan, Fukagawa (深川) may refer to:
 Fukagawa, Hokkaidō, a city
 Fukagawa Station
 Fukagawa, Tokyo, a region in Kōtō, Tokyo, formerly Fukagawa ward of Tokyo City